A voiturette is a small car.

Voiturette may also refer to:

 Léon Bollée Voiturette (1895; also "Hurtu Voiturette"), the first vehicle named "Voiturette", and first vehicle of Léon Bollée
 Renault Voiturette (1898), an early car, the first vehicle of Renault
 Voiturette, a race car class below pre-war Grand Prix class and pre-war Grand Touring class, the pre-WWII predecessor of Formula Two

See also

 American Voiturette Company, a U.S. carmaker
 Voiture (disambiguation)